Fred Anderson Field at Hornet Stadium is a 21,195-seat college football and track stadium in the western United States, on the campus of California State University, Sacramento (Sacramento State). it is the home field of the Sacramento State Hornets of the Big Sky Conference.

Opened  on September 20, 1969, it has also been the home stadium of the Sacramento Surge of the WLAF, the Sacramento Gold Miners of the Canadian Football League and the Sacramento Mountain Lions of the United Football League. It hosted the U.S. Olympic Trials for track and field in 2000 and 2004.

The field was natural grass for its first 41 seasons; FieldTurf was installed in 2010.

Stadium improvements

1992
 Temporary seating was installed at the end zones to increase capacity to 26,000 for the Sacramento Surge. These seats were removed in 1993 to accommodate for the larger CFL field.

1998
 Permanent chairbacks were installed in Section 213 at the 50–yard line.

2000
 The stadium underwent a $1 million improvement in preparation for the U.S. Track and Field Olympic Trials; An Olympic–sized track was installed surrounding the field as well as a practice track north of the stadium.

2003
 New scoreboard installed.

2007
 New public entrances

2008
 Broad Fieldhouse opened, which included new offices, locker rooms, athletic training room, weight room and a VIP patio.

2010
 Natural grass was replaced by FieldTurf Duraspine Pro.
 "The Well" opened next to the north end zone which provided paved areas for concessions.
 A Jumbotron was added below the scoreboard for Sacramento Mountain Lions' games.

Notable events
 On July 17, 1993, it was the site of the first regular season Canadian Football League (CFL) game ever played on American soil, where the Calgary Stampeders defeated the Gold Miners 38–36.
 Fred Anderson Field  hosted the first game between U.S. franchises in the CFL when the Las Vegas Posse defeated the Gold Miners 32–26.
 The largest crowd ever to witness an event at Fred Anderson Field  was when the Sacramento Surge defeated the Barcelona Dragons in the World League playoffs on May 30, 1992 in front of 26,445 fans.
 The then-largest Sacramento State crowd came on September 18, 1999, as the Hornets defeated arch–rival UC Davis in the Causeway Classic, 48–27, in front of 20,993 spectators.
 The Sacramento Mountain Lions played their first game at the stadium on September 25, 2010 in a 24–20 win over the Florida Tuskers in front of a crowd that was estimated to be over 20,000.
 The stadium hosted the U.S. Olympic Trials for track and field in 2000 and 2004.
 In 2011, the stadium hosted the World Masters Athletics Championships.
 The stadium hosted the California Interscholastic Federation State Football Championships from 2015 to 2017.
 The 2014 USA Outdoor Track and Field Championships was held  at  Fred Anderson Field . Organized by USA Track and Field, the four-day competition took place in conjunction with the USA Junior Combined Events Outdoor Track & Field Championships which started the day before and served as the national championships in track and field for the United States.
 The largest Sacramento State football crowd occurred on November 19, 2022 when 23,073 fans saw the Hornets complete an 11–0 season with a 27–21 victory over UC Davis in the Causeway Classic.

Gallery

See also
 List of NCAA Division I FCS football stadiums

References

External links
 Hornet Stadium website

1969 establishments in California
American football venues in California
Athletics (track and field) venues in California
Canadian Football League venues
Canadian football venues in the United States
College football venues
College track and field venues in the United States
Sacramento Gold Miners
Sacramento Mountain Lions stadiums
Sacramento State Hornets football
Sports venues completed in 1969
Sports venues in Sacramento, California
United Football League (2009–2012) venues